Jürgen Halper (born 17 November 1974) is an Austrian football manager, currently in charge of SC Neusiedl am See 1919.

External links
 

1974 births
Living people
Austrian footballers
Austrian football managers
Floridsdorfer AC managers
SC Neusiedl am See 1919 managers
FC Braunau players
Floridsdorfer AC players
FC Admira Wacker Mödling players
TSV Hartberg players
Association football midfielders